Roxbury may refer to:

Places
Canada
 Roxbury, Nova Scotia
 Roxbury, Prince Edward Island
United States
 Roxbury, Connecticut
 Roxbury, Kansas
 Roxbury, Maine
 Roxbury, Boston, a municipality that was later integrated into the city of Boston, Massachusetts
 Roxbury, New Hampshire
 Roxbury, New Jersey
 Roxbury, New York in Delaware County
 Roxbury, Queens, part of the Rockaway Peninsula in New York
 Roxbury, Ohio
 Roxbury, Pennsylvania
 Roxbury, Vermont
 Roxbury (Oak Grove, Virginia), a historic home near Oak Grove, Westmoreland County, Virginia
 Roxbury, Wisconsin, a town
 Roxbury (community), Wisconsin, an unincorporated community

See also
 Luna Park, Johnstown, former amusement park originally known as "Roxbury Park"
 A Night at the Roxbury, 1998 comedy film
 Roxbury News, independent video news company
 West Roxbury, Massachusetts, a section of Boston
 Roxboro (disambiguation)
 Roxborough (disambiguation)
 Roxburgh (disambiguation)